In the UEFA qualification for the 2003 FIFA Women's World Cup, the 16 teams belonging to the First Category of European women's football were drawn into four groups, from which the group winners qualify for the World Cup finals. The winner of the Qualifying Playoffs between the Runners-up of each four group will also qualify.

CLASS A

Group 1

Match schedule & results

Group 2

Match schedule & results

Group 3

Match schedule & results

Group 4

Match schedule & results

Germany qualified for 2003 FIFA Women's World Cup.

CLASS B

Group 5

Group 6

Group 7

Group 8

Play-off

Semi-finals 

France won 3-1 on aggregate. 

England won 3-2 on aggregate.

Final 

France won 2-0 on aggregate and qualified for 2003 FIFA Women's World Cup.

External links 
 2003 Women's World Cup Preliminaries at FIFA.com
 Results at RSSSF

2001 in women's association football
2002 in women's association football
UEFA
Women
Women
2003